The Sur la Perche à la Pyramide event was part of the archery programme at the 1900 Summer Olympics. Only the names of the three top placers are known.

There were at most 126 other competitors in this event, as 129 archers competed in the two "à la perche" events. However, whether all of those archers entered both events or not (and if not, how many actually did contest each) is unknown. The event was contested on 15 and 16 July 1900. The Netherlands likely had archers in the event; 6 Dutch archers competed in the 1900 Olympic archery events though which events they entered specifically is unknown.

Background

This was the only appearance of the men's Sur La Perche À La Pyramide.

Competition format

Little is known about the format of the competition, other than that the targets were on poles at 28 metres.

Schedule

Results

References

External links
 International Olympic Committee medal winners database
 De Wael, Herman. Herman's Full Olympians: "Archery 1900". Accessed 17 January 2006.
 

Sur la Perche a la Pyramide